Protostelium okumukumu is a species of Protostelium.

See also 

 Protosteliales

References 

Mycetozoa